Cysteine-rich PDZ-binding protein is a protein that in humans is encoded by the CRIPT gene.

Interactions
CRIPT has been shown to interact with DLG3.

References

Further reading

External links